Escherichia is a genus of Gram-negative, non-spore-forming, facultatively anaerobic, rod-shaped bacteria from the family Enterobacteriaceae. In those species which are inhabitants of the gastrointestinal tracts of warm-blooded animals, Escherichia species provide a portion of the microbially derived vitamin K for their host. A number of the species of Escherichia are pathogenic. The genus is named after Theodor Escherich, the discoverer of Escherichia coli. Escherichia are facultative aerobes, with both aerobic and anaerobic growth, and an optimum temperature of 37 °C. Escherichia are usually motile by flagella, produce gas from fermentable carbohydrates, and do not decarboxylate lysine or hydrolyze arginine. Species include E. albertii, E. fergusonii, E. hermannii, E. marmotae and most notably, the model organism and clinically relevant E. coli. Shimwellia blattae  and Pseudescherichia vulneris were formerly classified in this genus.

Pathogenesis
While many Escherichia are commensal members of the gut microbiota, certain strains of some species, most notably the pathogenic serotypes of E. coli, are human pathogens, and are the most common cause of urinary tract infections, significant sources of gastrointestinal disease, ranging from simple diarrhea to dysentery-like conditions, as well as a wide range of other pathogenic states classifiable in general as colonic escherichiosis. While E. coli is responsible for the vast majority of Escherichia-related pathogenesis, other members of the genus have also been implicated in human disease. Escherichia are associated with the imbalance of microbiota of the lower reproductive tract of women. These species are associated with inflammation.

See also
 E. coli O157:H7
 List of bacterial genera named after personal names

References

External links
 Escherichia genomes and related information at PATRIC, a Bioinformatics Resource Center funded by NIAID

 
Gut flora bacteria
Gram-negative bacteria
Pathogenic bacteria
Bacteria genera